The 1932–33 season was Manchester United's 37th season in the Football League. They improved on the previous season's 12th-place finish, but sixth in the final table was not enough for promotion from the Second Division.

Second Division

FA Cup

Squad statistics

References

Manchester United F.C. seasons
Manchester United